Laos is an independent republic, and the only landlocked nation in Southeast Asia, northeast of Thailand, west of Vietnam. It covers 236,800 square kilometers in the center of the Southeast Asian peninsula and it is surrounded by Myanmar (Burma), Cambodia, the People's Republic of China, Thailand, and Vietnam. About seventy percent of its geographic area is made up of mountain ranges, highlands, plateaux, and rivers cut through.

Its location has often made it a buffer state between more powerful neighboring states, as well as a crossroads for trade and communication.

Topography

Most of the western border of Laos is demarcated by the Mekong river, which is an important artery for transportation. The Dong Falls at the southern end of the country prevent access to the sea, but cargo boats travel along the entire length of the Mekong in Laos during most of the year. Smaller power boats and pirogues provide an important means of transportation on many of the tributaries of the Mekong.

The Mekong has thus not been an obstacle but a facilitator for communication, and the similarities between Laos and northeast Thai society—same people, almost same language—reflect the close contact that has existed across the river for centuries. Also, many Laotians living in the Mekong Valley have relatives and friends in Thailand.

Prior to the twentieth century, Laotian kingdoms and principalities encompassed areas on both sides of the Mekong, and Thai control in the late nineteenth century extended to the left bank. Although the Mekong was established as a border by French colonial forces, travel from one side to the other has been significantly limited only since the establishment of the Lao People's Democratic Republic (LPDR, or Laos) in 1975.

The eastern border with Vietnam extends for 2,130 kilometres, mostly along the crest of the Annamite Chain, and serves as a physical barrier between the Chinese-influenced culture of Vietnam and the Indianized states of Laos and Thailand. These mountains are sparsely populated by tribal minorities who traditionally have not acknowledged the border with Vietnam any more than lowland Lao have been constrained by the 1,754-kilometre Mekong River border with Thailand. Thus, ethnic minority populations are found on both the Laotian and Vietnamese sides of the frontier. Because of their relative isolation, contact between these groups and lowland Lao has been mostly confined to trading.

Laos shares its short—only 541 kilometres—southern border with Cambodia, and ancient Khmer ruins at Wat Pho and other southern locations attest to the long history of contact between the Lao and the Khmer. In the north, the country is bounded by a mountainous 423-kilometre border with China and shares the 235-kilometre-long Mekong River border with Myanmar.

The topography of Laos is largely mountainous, with the Annamite Range in the northeast and east and the Luang Prabang Range in the northwest, among other ranges typically characterized by steep terrain. Elevations are typically above 500 metres with narrow river valleys and low agricultural potential. This mountainous landscape extends across most of the north of the country, except for the plain of Vientiane and the Plain of Jars in the Xiangkhoang Plateau.

The southern "panhandle" of the country contains large level areas in Savannakhét and Champasak provinces that are well suited for extensive paddy rice cultivation and livestock raising. Much of Khammouan Province and the eastern part of all the southern provinces are mountainous. Together, the alluvial plains and terraces of the Mekong and its tributaries cover only about 20% of the land area.

Only about 4% of the total land area is classified as arable. The forested land area has declined significantly since the 1970s as a result of commercial logging and expanded swidden, or slash-and-burn, farming.

Climate

Laos has a tropical climate, with a pronounced rainy season from May through October, a cool dry season from November through February, and a hot dry season in March and April. Generally, monsoons occur at the same time across the country, although that time may vary significantly from one year to the next.

Rainfall varies regionally, with the highest amounts— annually—recorded on the Bolovens Plateau in Champasak Province.

Rainfall is not always adequate for rice cultivation and the relatively high average precipitation conceals years where rainfall may be only half or less of the norm, causing significant declines in rice yields. Such droughts often are regional, leaving production in other parts of the country unaffected.

The average temperatures in January, coolest month, are, Luang Prabang 20.5 °C (minimum 0.8 °C), Vientiane 20.3 °C (minimum 3.9 °C), and Pakse 23.9 °C (minimum 8.2 °C); the average temperatures for April, usually the hottest month, are, Luang Prabang 28.1 °C (maximum 44.8 °C), Vientiane 39.4 °C). Temperature does vary according to the altitude, there is an average drop of 1.7 °C for every 1000 feet (or 300 meters). Temperatures in the upland plateux and in the mountains are considered lower than on the plains around Vientiane.

Laos is highly vulnerable to the effects of global climate change; nearly all provinces in Laos are at high risks from climate change.

Agriculture 
Agriculture in Laos is the most important sector of the economy. Five million out of 23,680,000 hectares of Laos's total land area is suitable for cultivation, and seventeen percent of the land area, between 850,000 and 900,000 hectares, was cultivated as of the early 1990s. Rice is the main crop grown during the rainy season.

Agricultural cultivation is possible during with varying weather on a small portion of land area apart from the Vientiane plain and the lowlands along the Mekong Valley. These cultivated areas are situated in the valley cuts by the rivers or the plateau regions of Xieng Khouang in the North and in the Bolovens in the south. Typically there are only two ways to cultivate: either the wet-field paddy system practiced among the Lao Loum or lowland in Lao, or the swidden cultivation system practiced in the hills.

Human geography 

The overall population density was only eighteen persons per square kilometer, and in many districts the density was fewer than ten persons per square kilometer. Population density per cultivated hectare was considerably high ranging from 3.3 to 7.8 persons per hectare.

Natural resources and environmental issues

The natural resources of Laos include timber, hydropower, gypsum, tin, gold, and gemstones.
Laos is increasingly suffering from environmental problems, with deforestation a particularly significant issue, as expanding commercial exploitation of the forests, plans for additional hydroelectric facilities, foreign demand for wild animals and nonwood forest products for food and traditional medicines, and a growing population all create increasing pressure.

The United Nations Development Programme warns: "Protecting the environment and sustainable use of natural resources in Lao PDR is vital for poverty reduction and economic growth."

Area and boundaries

 Area:
 Total: 
 Land: 
 Water: 
 Area comparison:
 Slightly larger than Guyana
 Slightly smaller than the United Kingdom
 Land boundaries:
 Total: 
 Border countries:
 Cambodia: 
 China: 
 Myanmar: 
 Thailand: 
 Vietnam: 
 Elevation extremes:
 Lowest point: Mekong River 
 Highest point: Phou Bia

See also
National Biodiversity Conservation Areas
Zomia
Transport in Laos

References

Attribution:

 
Regions of Southeast Asia

bn:লাওস#ভূগোল